Mackaya is a genus of flowering plants in the family Acanthaceae, disjunctly distributed in Brazil, South Africa, and the eastern Himalayas, Southeast Asia and China. It is sister to Asystasia.

Species
Currently accepted species include:

Mackaya bella Harv.
Mackaya indica (Nees) Ensermu
Mackaya neesiana (Wall.) Das
Mackaya tapingensis (W.W.Sm.) Y.F.Deng & C.Y.Wu

Cultivation
Some species are cultivated as ornamental plants. Mackaya bella from South Africa, a small evergreen shrub with purple-veined white flowers, has received the Royal Horticultural Society's Award of Garden Merit.

References

Acanthaceae
Acanthaceae genera